5 West 63rd Street is a 14-story building in the Upper West Side neighborhood of Manhattan in New York City, on 63rd Street near the western edge of Central Park. It is part of the Central Park West Historic District. Completed in 1930 and designed by Dwight James Baum, it is the home of the West Side YMCA. It is constructed in brick, limestone and terra cotta, with a steel frame.

The site was formerly occupied by seven 5-story brick rowhouses at 3–11 West 63rd Street and 8–12 West 64th Street.

References

External links
"Streetscapes/The West Side Y, at 5 West 63rd Street; Urban Scale, and a Suggestion of Italian Hill Town" – The New York Times, June 16, 2002
The Westside YMCA - 5 West 63rd Street – Dayton in Manhattan

1930 establishments in New York City
Commercial buildings in Manhattan
Upper West Side
63rd Street (Manhattan)
Commercial buildings completed in 1930